The 2021 European Talent Cup was the fifth season of the European Talent Cup.

The season was marred by the death of 14 year old Hugo Millán, who was killed in an accident at the Aragón round.

Calendar 
The calendar was published in November 2020. The round at Barcelona made a return for 2021.

Entry list

Championship standings 

 Scoring system

Points were awarded to the top fifteen finishers. A rider had to finish the race to earn points.

Riders' championship

References

2021 in motorcycle sport
2021 in Spanish motorsport